McNary is an unincorporated community (pop. ~250) at the intersection of Interstate 10 and State Highway 20. It is two miles from the Rio Grande and 23 miles west of Sierra Blanca in southwestern Hudspeth County. The area was initially settled in 1921, and named Nulo. The town was renamed McNary, after James G. McNary, a local businessman, in September 1923 when the Galveston, Harrisburg and San Antonio Railway established a station in the area. It served as a shipping point for cotton from the Algodon Plantation.

In Stephen King's novella "Rita Hayworth and Shawshank Redemption," Andy Dufresne, the unjustly imprisoned man who is the hero of the story, crosses into Mexico at McNary after escaping from the fictional Shawshank State Prison in Maine.

External links
 
 

Unincorporated communities in Hudspeth County, Texas
Unincorporated communities in Texas